The Capella Savaria is a Hungarian ensemble that perform chamber music on original instruments (and instruments based on original designs).

Established in 1981, in Szombathely, they most often perform music from the 17th and 18th centuries, and have performed around Europe, as well as making a number of recordings. In 1991, they received the Liszt Prize.

Their current artistic director is Zsolt Kalló.

External links
 Official Site

Chamber music groups
Hungarian classical musicians
Hungarian musical groups
Musical groups established in 1981